Mark Edward Bailey (20 August 1951 – August 22, 2021) was a Canadian diplomat. Bailey was appointed Ambassador to the Republic of Austria, with concurrent accreditation as Ambassador and Permanent Representative to the International Organizations in Vienna, on September 20, 2013.

Bailey (BA Honours [Political Science], University of Victoria, 1973) joined the Canadian Department of External Affairs in 1973. In Ottawa, Mr. Bailey has served in the Personnel Operations Division, as desk officer for the Organisation for Economic Co-operation and Development, as deputy director of investment policy and financial affairs, and as director of the International Financial and Investment Affairs Division. He has also worked as the director of the Maghreb and Arabian Peninsula Division, director of the Assignments Division and director general of the Middle East and North Africa Bureau. Mr. Bailey has served abroad in New York City; Abidjan, Côte d'Ivoire; Jeddah, Saudi Arabia; Geneva, Switzerland; and Washington, D.C. In addition, Mr. Bailey has been posted as ambassador to Morocco, ambassador to Syria and ambassador to Turkey, with non-resident accreditation to Azerbaijan, Georgia and Turkmenistan. In January 2012, Mr. Bailey was named special adviser on Iran and Syria. Most recently, he was director general of the Middle East Bureau. Mr. Bailey replaces John Barrett.

External links 
 Foreign Affairs and International Trade Canada Complete List of Posts
Diplomatic Appointments, Media Relations Office, Foreign Affairs, Trade and Development Canada

Living people
1951 births
Ambassadors of Canada to Morocco
Ambassadors of Canada to Syria